Michael Downes (21 October 1868 – 21 May 1943) was an Irish hurler who played with the Limerick senior team.

Born in Kilfinane, County Limerick, Downes first played competitive hurling in his youth. He quickly established himself on the Kilfinane team and won county senior championship medals in 1897 and 1899.

After success at club level, Downes joined the Limerick senior team. He was part of the team that won All-Ireland, Munster and Croke Cup titles in 1897.

Honours

Kilfinane
Limerick Senior Hurling Championship (2): 1897, 1899

Limerick
All-Ireland Senior Hurling Championship (1): 1897
Munster Senior Hurling Championship (1): 1897
 Croke Cup (1): 1897

References

1868 births
1943 deaths
Kilfinane hurlers
Limerick inter-county hurlers